is a municipality in the Nordmøre region located in the northeast part of Møre og Romsdal county, Norway. The administrative center of the municipality is the village of Sunndalsøra. Other villages include Gjøra, Grøa, Hoelsand, Jordalsgrenda, Romfo, Ålvund, Ålvundeidet, and Øksendalsøra. The important occupations in Sunndal include industry (with Hydro Aluminium Sunndal as the biggest employer), public services, retail, and farming.

The  municipality is the 47th largest by area out of the 356 municipalities in Norway and it is the largest in Møre og Romsdal county. Sunndal is the 143rd most populous municipality in Norway with a population of 6,932.

General information

The parish of Sunndal was established as a municipality on 1 January 1838 (see formannskapsdistrikt law). In 1854, the northern part of the municipality (population: 1,291) was separated to form the new municipality of Øksendal. This left 2,188 residents in Sunndal. During the 1960s, there were many municipal mergers across Norway due to the work of the Schei Committee. On 1 January 1960, the neighboring municipalities of Ålvundeid (population: 513) and Øksendal (population: 497) were merged with Sunndal (population: 5,851) to form a new, larger Sunndal municipality. Both Ålvundeid and Øksendal were historically part of the municipality before 1854. Then, on 1 January 1965, the Ålvund-Ålvundfjord area of the neighboring Stangvik Municipality (population: 508) was transferred to Sunndal.

Name
Before 1870, the name was written Sunddalen (or Sunndalen); during the period from 1870 to 1917, it was spelled Sundalen; and since 1918, it has been spelled Sunndal.

Coat of arms
The coat of arms was granted on 12 April 1983. The arms show a Norwegian wormwood (Artemisia norvegica) plant in white on a green background. This species has its main European distribution in Sunndal and Oppdal in the Dovrefjell-Sunndalsfjella National Park and in Trollheimen landscape protected area. Small populations also in Ryfylke, Scotland, and the Ural Mountains, with another subspecies in the mountains of Northern America. It can be found in abundance in many places in the mountains of Sunndal well above tree line.

Churches
The Church of Norway has four parishes within the municipality of Sunndal. It is part of the Indre Nordmøre prosti (deanery) in the Diocese of Møre.

Geography

Sunndal is bordered on the west by Nesset Municipality and Tingvoll Municipality, on the north by Surnadal Municipality, on the east by Oppdal Municipality (in Trøndelag county) and on the south by Lesja Municipality (in Oppland county).

In the southern part of the municipality lies the Dovrefjell–Sunndalsfjella National Park, home to a plentiful amount of impressive muskox. In the northern part is the Trollheimen and Innerdalen landscape protection areas.

The municipality centers around the Sunndalsfjorden and the river Driva. There are also many towering mountains including: Trolla, Storskrymten, Vinnufjellet (with peaks Dronningkrona and Kongskrona), Innerdalstårnet, Salhøa, Såtbakkollen, Skarfjellet, and Vassnebba. The Vinnufossen and Svøufallet waterfalls both lie near the river Driva.

Climate
Sunndalsøra has a temperate oceanic climate (Cfb). Atlantic lows can produce a strong foehn effect in winter as the air is forced over the mountains surrounding Sunndalsøra. Sunndalsøra has the national record high for January and February. The record high  is from July 2014, and the record low  is from February 2010.

Government
All municipalities in Norway, including Sunndal, are responsible for primary education (through 10th grade), outpatient health services, senior citizen services, unemployment and other social services, zoning, economic development, and municipal roads. The municipality is governed by a municipal council of elected representatives, which in turn elect a mayor.  The municipality falls under the Møre og Romsdal District Court and the Frostating Court of Appeal.

Municipal council
The municipal council of Sunndal is made up of 27 representatives that are elected to four year terms. The party breakdown of the council is as follows:

Mayor
The mayors of Sunndal (incomplete list):
2009–present: Ståle Refstie (Ap)
2007-2009: Tove-Lise Torve (Ap)
2003-2007: Knut Reinset (Sp)
1988-2003: Jan Silseth (Ap)
1959-1973: Oskar Edøy (Ap)

Notable people 

 Barbara Arbuthnott (1822–1904) a Scottish woman who lived in Sunndal where she engaged in charitable work and wrote about her life
 Hagbard Emanuel Berner (1839 in Sunndal – 1920) a jurist, politician and newspaper editor
 Nils Sletbak (1896 in Sunndal – 1982) a jurist and theatre director
 Oskar Edøy (1916–2008) a politician, Mayor of Sunndal municipality 1959-1973
 Einar Sæter (1917 in Øksendal – 2010) a triple jumper, resistance member, newspaper editor and writer
 Tor Erik Jenstad (born 1956 in Sunndal) a linguist, dictionary editor and traditional Norwegian folk musician
 Tove-Lise Torve (born 1964 in Sunndalsøra) a nurse and politician, Mayor of Sunndal municipality 2007-2009

Sport 
 Tor Erik Torske (born 1983) a footballer with 275 club caps
 Andrine Hegerberg (born 1993 in Sunndalsøra) a footballer
 Guro Reiten (born 1994 in Sunndalsøra) a footballer
 Ada Hegerberg (born 1995) a footballer, brought up in Sunndalsøra

References

External links

Municipal fact sheet from Statistics Norway 
Sunndalsnett 
Culture in Sunndal on the map from Kulturnett.no 
Sunndal kommune (Municipality of Sunndal) 

 
Nordmøre
Municipalities of Møre og Romsdal
1838 establishments in Norway